Jack Ryan may refer to:

People

Sports

Australian rules football
Jack Ryan (footballer, born 1873) (1873–1931), Australian rules footballer for St Kilda
Jack Ryan (footballer, born 1907) (1907–1959), Australian rules footballer for Hawthorn
Jack Ryan (footballer, born 1914) (1914–1976), Australian rules footballer for Footscray and North Melbourne

Baseball
Jack Ryan (catcher) (1868–1952), MLB catcher and University of Virginia baseball coach
Jack Ryan (outfielder) (1905–1967), MLB outfielder
Jack Ryan (pitcher) (1884–1949), Major League Baseball pitcher

Other sports
Jack Ryan (English footballer) (born 1996), English footballer
Jack Ryan (streetball player), American streetball player
Jack Ryan (Moneygall hurler) (born 1946), Irish hurler and Gaelic footballer for Tipperary
Jack Ryan (Roscrea hurler) (born 1927), Irish hurler for Tipperary

Other people 
Jack Ryan (designer) (1926–1991), designer and Zsa Zsa Gabor's sixth husband
Jack Ryan (FBI agent) (born 1938), former FBI agent
Jack Ryan (politician) (born 1959), former candidate for United States Senator from Illinois and ex-husband of actress Jeri Ryan
John M. Ryan (born 1949), American attorney

Arts, entertainment, and media
Jack Ryan (character), a character in a series of novels by Tom Clancy
Jack Ryan (film series), based on Tom Clancy's character
Jack Ryan (TV series), an Amazon Video television series based on Tom Clancy's character
Jack Ryan: Shadow Recruit, a 2014 film based on Tom Clancy's character
Jack Ryan, a character in the Bioshock video game series
Jack Ryan, the titular character in a series of novels by Elmore Leonard; see Unknown Man No. 89

See also
John Ryan (disambiguation)

Ryan, Jack